National Art Education Association Women's Caucus is an interest group of the professional art education organization, the National Art Education Association.

Mission
“The NAEA’s Women’s Caucus (NAEA WC) shall represent and work to advance art education as an advocate of equity for women and all people who encounter injustice, and shall work to eliminate discriminatory gender and other stereotyping practices for individuals and groups, and for the concerns of women art educators and artists.”

History
The Women's Caucus became an official interest group of the National Art Education Association in 1975 under the leadership of art educator Judy Loeb as the first president of the group. The Women's Caucus held its first session at the 1975 NAEA convention in Miami, FL.

The group formed to address the inequities faced by “women and all people who encounter, injustice” including improving awareness of the work of women artists and women art educators. However, the membership of the Women's Caucus has always been open and inclusive of people of all genders.

The Women's Caucus archives are housed at the Pennsylvania State University Libraries.

Awards
The Women's Caucus annually recognizes the contributions of outstanding art educators at the NAEA annual convention through five awards: the Kathy Connors Teaching Award, the Mary J. Rouse Award, the Carrie Nordlund pre-K-12 Feminist Pedagogy Award, the Maryl Fletcher de Jong Service Award, and the June King McFee Award.

References

External links 

 NAEA Women's Caucus YouTube channel

Feminist art organizations
Feminist art organizations in the United States
Professional associations based in the United States
Women's occupational organizations